David M. Schwarz (born 26 January 1951) is an American architect and designer. He is the President & CEO of Washington, D.C.-based David M. Schwarz Architects, Inc. and serves as the Chairman of the Yale School of Architecture's Dean's Council.

Schwarz's work focuses primarily on contextual, humanistic design and urbanist planning principles. Schwarz himself has labeled his work, and that of his eponymous firm, as populist and neo-eclectic in style. In 2015, David Schwarz was awarded the University of Notre Dame's Richard H. Driehaus Architecture Prize on 21 March 2015 in Chicago for his work which embodies the highest ideals of traditional and classical architecture in contemporary society, and creates a positive cultural, environmental, and artistic impact.

Early life and education 
Schwarz was born in Los Angeles, California. He received his undergraduate degree from St. John's College in Annapolis, Maryland in 1972 before attending the Yale School of Architecture and earning a Master of Architecture in 1974.

Immediately following his graduation from Yale, Schwarz interned for noted architects Paul Rudolph, Edward Larrabee Barnes, and former Yale professor Charles Moore.

Career 
Schwarz moved to Washington, D.C. and founded David M. Schwarz Architectural Services in 1976. The firm was incorporated in 1978 and renamed David M. Schwarz Architects, Inc in 2008.

While his early career was focused primarily on the renovation of row houses in historic districts of Washington, D.C., such as Adams Morgan, Dupont Circle, and Mount Pleasant, Schwarz has since applied his self-proclaimed populist style to arenas, schools, baseball stadia, performing arts venues, retail districts, healthcare facilities, apartment buildings, and academic campuses across the United States.

Outreach and philanthropy 
Schwarz was among the first Board Members of the National Building Museum. During his time on the Board of Directors he helped create both the Vincent Scully Prize and the National Building Museum Honor Award. Schwarz now serves as the Jury Chairman for the Vincent J. Scully Prize Fund Endowement.

David Schwarz served as the Davenport Visiting Professor at the Yale School of Architecture in the fall of 2008 and taught a fifth-year design studio at The University of Notre Dame in 2010. He is a Sterling Fellow of Yale University.

Notable works 

Cook Children’s Medical Center in Fort Worth, Texas
Ed Smith Stadium (renovation) in Sarasota, Florida
ESPN Wide World of Sports Complex in Baylake, Florida
George Dean Johnson Jr., College of Business Administration and Economics at the University of South Carolina Upstate in Spartanburg, South Carolina
Southlake Town Square in Southlake, Texas
Sundance Square Plaza in Fort Worth, Texas
Tarrant County Family Law Center in Fort Worth, Texas
The Yale Environmental Science Center in New Haven, Connecticut
E. Bronson Ingram College at Vanderbilt University in Nashville, Tennessee
Nicholas S. Zeppos College at Vanderbilt University
Rothschild College at Vanderbilt University

Dallas–Fort Worth metro area works 
Though based in Washington, D.C., Schwarz has completed dozens of projects in the Dallas–Fort Worth metroplex. Most notably, he is responsible for the creation of the development plan behind the Sundance Square neighborhood in downtown Fort Worth, Texas, as well as the master plan and building design for Cook Children's Medical Center.

A list of building architectural design projects in the Dallas–Fort Worth metroplex completed by David M. Schwarz

American Airlines Center in Dallas, Texas
Chase Bank Building in Fort Worth, Texas
Cook Children’s Medical Center in Fort Worth, Texas
Dr Pepper Ballpark in Frisco, Texas
Firewheel Town Center in Garland, Texas
Fort Worth Central Library in Fort Worth, Texas
Frisco Square in Frisco, Texas
Globe Life Park in Arlington (formerly The Ballpark in Arlington) in Arlington, Texas
Lon Evans Correctional Center in Fort Worth, Texas
Maddox-Muse Center in Fort Worth, Texas
Nancy Lee & Perry R. Bass Performance Hall in Fort Worth, Texas
National Cowgirl Museum and Hall of Fame in Fort Worth, Texas
Parker Square in Flower Mound, Texas
Sid Richardson Museum in Fort Worth, Texas 
Southlake Town Square in Southlake, Texas
Southlake Town Hall in Southlake, Texas
Sundance East in Fort Worth, Texas
Sundance Square Plaza in Fort Worth, Texas
Sundance West in Fort Worth, Texas
Tarrant County Family Law Center in Fort Worth, Texas
The Brownstones at Southlake Town Square
The Cassidy & Trust Building in Fort Worth, Texas
The Carnegie Building in Fort Worth, Texas
The Commerce Building in Fort Worth, Texas
The Westbrook in Fort Worth, Texas
West Village in Dallas, Texas

References

External links

Official website of David M. Schwarz Architects, Inc. (DMSAS)
Street Smarts: Architect David M. Schwarz (incl. video interview), Chicago Tonight

1951 births
Living people
Yale School of Architecture alumni
Yale University faculty
Yale School of Architecture faculty
Fellows of the American Institute of Architects
Architects from Washington, D.C.
Architects from Los Angeles
New Classical architects
Driehaus Architecture Prize winners
20th-century American architects
21st-century American architects